The Opposition were a long running post-punk band from London, England that featured Ralph Hall, Marcus Bell and Mark Long, and mixed new wave sounds with reggae rhythms.

Founded in 1979, The Opposition released their first single on the independent record label Double Vision Records. This was called "Very Little Glory" which the NME (New Musical Express) reviewed and said that it was "a song recorded before its time".

With the press picking up on the band, they switched from indie to major and secured a contract with the Ariola Records label in Europe. A single called "This Year" came out on Ariola, followed by the self-produced Breaking the Silence album released in Sep. 1981, and a French tour.

The band then signed to Virgin Records offshoot Charisma Records and released the Intimacy album in 1982.  Two more albums, Promises in 1984 and Empire Days in 1985 followed in the next two years.  On these releases, the band worked with producer Kenny Jones.

The band took a hiatus in 1987, when Bell and Long began working on more commercial-sounding material under the name So.  Their album, Horseshoe in the Glove, yielded a minor US hit in the song "Are You Sure", which, despite receiving a moderate amount of airplay on rock radio and being named an MTV "Video of the Week", barely missed reaching Billboard's Top 40, peaking at number 41. The song also reached number 62 in the UK Singles chart at the beginning of 1988.

The Opposition then regrouped and released the album Blue Alice Blue in 1990, again recorded with Kenny Jones.

Marcus Bell died from cancer in December 2014. Mark Long died from cancer aged 67 in 2022.

Discography
 Breaking the Silence (1981), Double Vision Records
 Intimacy (1982), Double Vision Records
 Promises (1984), Charisma Records
 Empire Days (1985), Charisma Records
 Blue Alice Blue (1990), Declic Records
 '81/'82 (1991), Midnight Music
 War Begins at Home (1994), Universal
 Blinder (2004), Mrs Jones Records
 New York, Paris, Peckham (2004), Right Back Records – live album
 EP2 (2010), Mrs Jones Records
 Love and Betrayal (2011), Mrs Jones Records
 Somewhere in Between (2016), Aztec Musique
 Live Eighties (2018), Aztec Musique – live album
 Hope (2021), Aztec Musique

References

External links
 
 Mrs Jones Records
 Right Back Records

English post-punk music groups
Musical groups from London
English rock music groups
Musical groups established in 1979
English new wave musical groups
Cold wave groups